Institute for Nuclear Research of the National Academy of Sciences of Ukraine (KINR)  located in Kyiv, Ukraine. The Institute publishes journal Nuclear Physics and Atomic Energy.

History
Soon after the World War II, in 1944 at the Institute of Physics in Kyiv was created a department for dealing with number of issues concerning nuclear physics and use atomic energy. For execution of outlined activities sequentially were placed into operation: in 1956 a cyclotron U-120, in 1960 a research reactor VVR-M (Water-Water), and in 1964 an electro-static generator EGP-5.

On 26 March 1970 the Presidium of the National Academy of Sciences of Ukraine (at that time Ukrainian Academy of Sciences) in pursuance of the relevant resolution of the Council of Ministers of the Ukrainian SSR adopted the resolution #105 about the creation of NASU Institute of Nuclear Research (IYaD) on the basis of a number of nuclear departments of the NASU Institute of Physics.

Major scientific directions
The main directions of scientific research are Nuclear Physics, Atomic Energy, Solid-state physics, Plasma Physics, Radiobiology and Radioecology.

Experimental facilities
Research Nuclear reactor WWR-M, Cyclotron U-120, Isochronous cyclotron U-240, 10 MeV Electrostatic Tandem Accelerator.

Directors
 1970 — 1974 Mitrofan Pasichnyk
 1974 — 1983 Oleh Nimets
 1984 — 2015 Ivan Vyshnevskyi
 2015 —  Vasyl Slisenko

Known scientists
Aleksandr Leipunskii
Vilen Strutinsky
Yuri G. Zdesenko

References

Nuclear research institutes
Research institutes in Kyiv
Science and technology in Kyiv
Research institutes in the Soviet Union
Institutes of the National Academy of Sciences of Ukraine
NASU Institute of Physics
Research institutes established in 1970
1970 establishments in the Soviet Union